Dubroca is a surname. Notable people with the surname include:

Cyril Dubroca (born 1981), French footballer
Daniel Dubroca (born 1954), French rugby union player and coach
Germain Dubroca (born about 1849), murdered Sandgate, Queensland, Australia 3rd April 1890